Branko Rasić (born 13 February 1976 in Prokuplje) is a Serbian football striker. He is a trainee of FK Crvena Zvezda. He is 1m 81 cm tall and weighs 79 kg.

He was the centre of a scandal in play-off match between Szczakowianka Jaworzno and RKS Radomsko, with Radomsko claiming he was ineligible to play as he was on loan from Victoria Jaworzno before the transfer window at the time. The case took several years to resolve, with numerous court proceedings, Polish FA involvement and even appeals to UEFA, Polish Olympic Committee, and debates in the Polish parliament. The case had widespread consequences, with many officials punished and removed from office as a result, and changes in law to prevent similar incidents in the future.

References

External links
 

1976 births
Living people
Serbian footballers
OFK Beograd players
Halcones de Querétaro footballers
FK Železničar Lajkovac players
Szczakowianka Jaworzno players
FC Kryvbas Kryvyi Rih players
Świt Nowy Dwór Mazowiecki players
Kujawiak Włocławek players
Unia Janikowo players
Victoria Jaworzno players
FK Radnički Obrenovac players
Serbian expatriate footballers
Expatriate footballers in Poland
Serbian expatriate sportspeople in Poland
Expatriate footballers in Ukraine
Serbian expatriate sportspeople in Ukraine
Expatriate footballers in Mexico
Serbia and Montenegro expatriate sportspeople in Mexico
Association football forwards
People from Prokuplje